Alan M. Kent (1967 – 20 July 2022) was a Cornish poet, dramatist, novelist, editor, academic and teacher.  He was the author of a number of works on Cornish and Anglo-Cornish literature.

Kent was born in 1967 in St Austell, Cornwall and died after a short illness on 20 July 2022, aged 55.

Plagiarism
In August 1997 The Times reported that poems by Kent had copied from the Scottish Gaelic language poet Derick Thomson. Kent had apparently copied a number of poems and just changed the names of places and people, locating them in Cornwall, instead of Scotland.

Selected works

Academic work
 Kent, A. M., 1996, ‘“Art Thou of Cornish Crew?”: Shakespeare, Henry V and Cornish Identity’, in Payton, P., ed., Cornish Studies Four, Exeter: University of Exeter Press, pp. 7-25. 
 Kent, A. M., 1998, Wives, Mothers and Sisters: Feminism, Literature and Women Writers in Cornwall, Penzance: The Patten Press in association with The Hypatia Trust. 
 Kent, A. M., 1999, ‘“At the Far End of England…”: Construction of Cornwall in Children’s Literature’, in Whetter, J. C. A., ed., An Baner Kernewek / The Cornish Banner, No. 98, Gorran Haven: Lyfrow Trelyspen Publications.
 Kent, A. M., 2000, The Literature of Cornwall: Continuity, Identity, Difference 1000-2000, Bristol: Redcliffe. 
 Kent, A. M., 2002, Pulp Methodism: The Lives and Literature of Silas, Joseph and Salome Hocking, St. Austell: Cornish Hillside Publications. 
 Kent, A. M., 2002, ‘“In Some State…”: A Decade of the Literature and Literary Studies of Cornwall’, in Payton, P., ed., Cornish Studies Ten, Exeter: University of Exeter Press, pp 212-239. 
 Kent, A. M., 2003, ‘Screening Kernow: Authenticity, Heritage and the Representation of Cornwall in Film and Television’, 1913-2003, in Payton, P., ed., Cornish Studies Eleven, Exeter: University of Exeter Press, pp. 110-141. 
 Kent, A. M., 2004, ‘“Drill Cores”: A Newly-Found Manuscript of Cousin Jack Narratives from the Upper Peninsula of Michigan, USA’, in Payton P., ed., Cornish Studies Twelve, Exeter: University of Exeter Press, pp. 106-143. 
 Kent, A. M., 2004, ‘Song of Our Motherland’: Making Meaning of the Life and Work of Katherine Lee Jenner 1853-1936, in Williams, D. R., Henry and Katherine Jenner: A Celebration of Cornwall’s Culture, Language and Identity, London: Francis Boutle Publishers
 Kent, A. M., 2005, ‘Scatting it t’lerrups: Provisional Notes Towards Alternative Methodologies in Language and Literary Studies in Cornwall’, in Payton, P., ed., Cornish Studies Thirteen, Exeter: University of Exeter Press, pp. 23-52. 
 Kent, A. M., 2006, ‘“Bringin’ the Dunkey Down from the Carn”: Cornu-English in Context 1549-2005 – A Provisional Analysis’, in Tristram, H. L. C., The Celtic Englishes III: The Interface between English and the Celtic Languages, Potsdam: Potsdam University Press
 Kent, A. M., 2007, ‘“Mozeying on down…”: The Cornish Language in America’, in Tristram, H. L. C., The Celtic Englishes IV: The Interface between English and the Celtic Languages, Potsdam: Potsdam University Press. 
 Kent, A. M., 2007, ‘Some ancientry that lingers: Dissent, difference and dialect in the Cornish and Cornu-English Literature of Robert Morton Nance’, in Thomas, P. W., and Williams, D., eds, Setting Cornwall on its Feet: Robert Morton Nance 1873-1959, London: Francis Boutle, pp. 98-152. 
 Kent, A. M., 2007, ‘Alex Parks, Punks and Pipers: Towards a History of Popular Music in Cornwall 1967-2007’, in Payton P., ed., Cornish Studies Fifteen, Exeter: University of Exeter Press, pp. 209-247. 
 Kent, A. M., 2009, ‘Mending the gap in the Medieval, Modern and Post-modern in New Cornish Studies: ‘Celtic’ materialism and the potential of presentism’, in Payton, P., Cornish Studies Twenty, Exeter, Exeter University Press, pp. 13-31. 
 Kent, A. M., 2009, ‘A Sustainable Literature? Ecocriticism, Environment and a New Eden in Cornwall’s China-Clay Mining Region’, in Payton, P., Cornish Studies Seventeen, Exeter: Exeter University Press, pp. 51-79. 
 Kent, A. M., 2010, The Theatre of Cornwall: Space, Place and Performance, Bristol, Redcliffe/Westcliffe Books. 
 Kent, A. M., 2012, From Igraine Ingrained to Callin’ ‘ome Mouzel: Two Paradigms of Memory, Language and Literature in Cornwall, in Tregidga, G., Memory, Place and Identity: The Cultural Landscapes of Cornwall, London, Francis Boutle Publishers. 
 Beard, A. & Kent, A. M., 2012, AQA English Literature B AS; 2nd ed., Cheltenham: Nelson Thornes Ltd. 
 Kent, A. M. & Staunton, M,. 2013, Towards a Cornish Philosophy: Values, Thought, and Language for the West Britons in the Twenty-First Century, Cathair na Mart: Evertype.

Editorial work
 Kent, A. M. & Saunders T., eds. and trs., 2000, Looking at the Mermaid: A Reader in Cornish Literature 900-1900, London: Francis Boutle Publishers. 
 Hale, A., Kent, A. M. & Saunders T. eds., 2000, Inside Merlin’s Cave: a Cornish Arthurian Reader, London: Francis Boutle Publishers. 
 Kent, A. M., ed., 2000, Voices from West Barbary: An Anthology of Anglo-Cornish Poetry, 1549-1928, London: Francis Boutle Publishers. 
 Hurst, J., Kent, A. M. & Symons, A. C., eds., 2003, The Awakening: Poems Newly Found by Jack Clemo. London: Francis Boutle Publishers. 
 Kent, A. M., ed., 2005, The Dreamt Sea: An Anthology of Anglo-Cornish Poetry 1928-2004. London: Francis Boutle Publishers. 
 Kent, A. M. & McKinney G., eds., 2008, The Busy Earth: A Reader in Global Cornish Literature 1700-2000, St. Austell: Cornish Hillside Publications. 
 Kent, A. M., ed., 2009, Charles Valentine Le Grice: Cornwall’s ‘Lost’ Romantic Poet, Selected Poems, St. Austell: Lyonesse Press. 
 Kent, A. M. & Williams D. R., 2010, The Francis Boutle Book of Cornish Short Stories, London, Francis Boutle Publishers. 
 Kent, A. M., ed., 2010, Four Modern Cornish Plays, London: Francis Boutle Publishers. 
 Kent, A. M., ed., 2013, Charles Causley Theatre Works, London: Francis Boutle Publishers.

Other works on Cornwall and the Cornish 
 Kent, A.M., 2004, Cousin Jack’s Mouth-Organ: Travels in Cornish America, St. Austell, Cornish Hillside Publications. 
 Kent, A.M., Merrifield D.L.J., 2004, The Book of Probus: Cornwall’s Garden Parish, Tiverton, Halsgrove. 
 Kent, A.M., Beare J., 2012, Celtic Cornwall: Penwith, West Cornwall & Scilly, Wellington, Halsgrove.

Creative writing - poetry
 Kent, A.M., 1994, Grunge, St Austell, Lyonesse Press. 
 Kent, A.M., Hodge P., 1995, Out of the Ordinalia, St. Austell, Lyonesse Press. 
 Kent, A.M., Hodge, P., Biscoe B,. 1995, Modern Cornish Poets/Berdh Arnowydh Kernewek, St. Austell, Lyonesse Press. 
 Kent, A.M., 2002, The Hensbarrow Homilies, Penzance, The Hypatia Trust. 
 Kent, A.M., 2002, Love and Seaweed, St. Austell, Lyonesse Press. 
 Kent, A.M., trs, 2005, Ordinalia: The Cornish Mystery Play Cycle – A Verse Translation, London, Francis Boutle Publishers.  978-1903427279
 Kent, A.M., 2005, Assassin of Grammar, Penzance, Hypatia Publications. 
 Kent, A.M., 2006, Stannary Parliament, St. Austell, Lyonesse Press. 
 Kent, A.M., 2008, Druid Offsetting, St. Austell, Lyonesse Press. 
Kent, A.M., 2010, The Hope of Place: Selected Poems in English 1990-2010. London, Francis Boutle Publishers.

Creative writing - plays

 Kent, A.M., 2006, Nativitas Christi / The Nativity: A New Cornish Mystery Play, London, Francis Boutle Publishers.  
 Kent, A.M., 2007, Oogly Es Sin: The Lamentable Ballad of Anthony Payne, Cornish Giant, London, Francis Boutle Publishers. 
 Kent, A.M., 2008, 2012, The Tin Violin, The adventures of Joseph Emidy: A Cornish tale, London, Francis Boutle Publishers. 
 Kent, A.M., 2009, Surfing Tommies: A Cornish Tragedy, London, Francis Boutle Publishers. 
 Kent, A.M., 2010, A Mere Interlude, London, Francis Boutle Publishers.

Creative writing - novels
 Kent, A.M., 1991, Clay, Launceston, Amigo Books 
 Kent, A.M., 1996, Yowann and the Knot of Time, St. Austell, Lyonesse Press Ltd. 
 Kent, A.M., 2005, Proper Job, Charlie Curnow! Tiverton, Halsgrove. 
 Kent, A.M., 2007, Electric Pastyland, Wellington, Halgrove. 
 Kent, A.M., Williams N., tr., 2010, The Cult of Relics: Devocyon dhe Greryow, Cathair na Mart, Evertype. Hardback 
 Kent, A.M., Williams N., tr., 2011, The Cult of Relics: Devocyon dhe Greryow, Cathair na Mart, Evertype. Paperback 
 Kent, A.M., 2011, Voodoo Pilchard, Wellington, Halgrove. 
 Kent, A.M., 2012, Voog’s Ocean, Wellington, Ryelands Publishing

Creative writing - children's literature
 Kent, A. M., Cailes, G. & Kennedy, N,. 2011, Beast of Bodmin Moor, Cathair na Mart: Evertype.

References

1967 births
2022 deaths
People from St Austell
Novelists from Cornwall
Poets from Cornwall